Kennedy Catholic High School is a private, Roman Catholic high school in Hermitage, Pennsylvania.  It is located in the Roman Catholic Diocese of Erie.

Background
Kennedy Catholic was established as Kennedy Christian High School in 1964. The original name of the proposed school was changed from Shenango Catholic Prep to Kennedy Christian High School after the death of President John F. Kennedy in November 1963.  The school first began classes as Kennedy Christian High School in the old Saint Bartholomew Elementary School in Sharpsville, Pennsylvania in the Fall of 1964.  In the Fall of 1965, the Kennedy Christian High School opened at its current site at: 2120 Shenango Valley Freeway Hermitage, Pa. 16148. The school was renamed Kennedy Catholic in 2001, by Bishop Emeritus Donald Trautman. In 2011, it was announced that Kennedy Catholic High School would become the sole high school of the newly formed Shenango Valley Catholic School System (also known as the Kennedy Catholic Family of Schools), along with the newly created Kennedy Catholic Middle School and Blessed John Paul II Elementary School, which were created from a restructuring effort following declining enrollment at St. Joseph's School and Notre Dame School, the area's two (former) parish schools.

Headmasters 

 Monsignor Edward Latimer (1964 - 1973)
 Father Andrew Karg (1973 - 1980)
 Father Henry Krebs (1980 - 1982)
 Father Eugene Kole (1982 - 1984)
 Pete Iacino (1984 - 2011)
 Father Marc Stockton (2011 - 2013)
 Father Michael P. Allison (2013 - 2016)
 Father Jason A. Glover (2016 - 2019)
 Vincent F. Cardamon (2019 - 2020)
 Mark A Ferrara (2020 - 2021)
 Melissa Joseph (2021 - Present)

Academics
The school has had a history of promoting academic excellence. The honors level/advanced placement courses are designed for the academically gifted, the high above average, and the very highly motivated student.  Admission to honors level and advanced courses are by invitation based on standardized testing, performance, and recommendation of the department.  The college preparatory level is for the strong average to above average student.  It is designed to challenge the student and to prepare the student well for admission to and success in college.  It is a well-rounded “liberal arts” education on the secondary level.  The general academic level is designed for the average and below average student with the goal of providing the student with basic and fundamental knowledge, information, and skills necessary to pursue a career, technical or trade education, or further education on a junior college level.  The latest data (2009) indicates that the current percent of Graduates who enroll in college is 98.

Pennsylvania Interscholastic Athletic Association State Championships

Boys Basketball  
1986  1987  1998  1999  2000  2001  2016  2017  2018  2019

Girls Basketball   
2001

Notable alumni
Michael Gruitza, Pennsylvania House of Representatives member
Joe Lombardi, professional basketball player
Nolan Reimold, former professional baseball player
Sean O'Brien (Ohio politician), current member of the Ohio Senate and former Ohio House of Representatives member
Sagaba Konate, professional basketball player for the Raptors 905 of the NBA G League
Oscar Tshiebwe, collegiate basketball player for University of Kentucky
 Jerome Jurenovich, FOX Sports South broadcaster

Notes and references

Catholic secondary schools in Pennsylvania
Educational institutions established in 1960
Schools in Mercer County, Pennsylvania
1960 establishments in Pennsylvania